The St Croix Pietenopol Aircamper is an American homebuilt aircraft, an adaptation of the classic 1920s Pietenpol Air Camper, re-designed by St Croix Aircraft of Corning, Iowa. When it was available the aircraft was supplied as a partial kit and in the form of plans for amateur construction.

Design and development
St Croix Aircraft principals Chad and Charles Willie had built several Pietenopol Air Campers starting in 1941. The St Croix version of the Pietenopol Aircamper is longer and heavier than the original design, with slightly more wingspan.

The St Croix Pietenopol Aircamper features a cantilever strut-braced parasol wing, two-seats in individual tandem open cockpits with windshields, fixed conventional landing gear and a single engine in tractor configuration.

The aircraft is made with a wooden structure, with some steel parts and its flying surfaces covered in doped aircraft fabric.

The designer estimated the construction time from the supplied partial kit and plans as 1000 hours.

The design was later further developed into a biplane, by adding lower wings to the parasol Aircamper, resulting in the St Croix Pietenpol Aerial.

Specifications (St Croix Pietenopol Aircamper)

References

Aircamper
1960s United States sport aircraft
1960s United States ultralight aircraft
1960s United States civil utility aircraft
Single-engined tractor aircraft
Parasol-wing aircraft
Homebuilt aircraft